Daizo Sasaki (born 20 November 1990) is a Japanese kickboxer, currently competing in the super lightweight divisions of Krush and K-1. He is the former Krush Super Lightweight champion, the former Krush Lightweight champion, the 2018 K-1 Super Lightweight Grand Prix finalist and a one-time K-1 World GP Super Lightweight title challenger.

As of June 2022, Sasaki is the #6 ranked featherweight in the world according to Combat Press. He's been continuously ranked in the featherweight top ten since February 2021.

Kickboxing career

Lightweight career

Krush lightweight tournament
At a press conference held by Krush on December 2, 2015, it was announced that Sasaki would be one of eight participants in the 2016 Krush lightweight tournament, held to fill the throne left vacant by Hideaki Yamazaki. Sasaki faced Hisaki Higashimoto at Krush 62 on January 17, 2016, in the tournament quarterfinals. He won the fight by majority decision. Two of the judges scored the fight 30–29 in his favor, while the third judge scored it an even 30–30 draw.

Advancing to the tournament semifinals, held at Krush 64 on March 20, 2016, Sasaki was booked to face Takayuki Minamino. He won the fight by unanimous decision, with the judges scoring the bout 30–29 for him, while the third judge awarded him a 30–28 scorecard. Sasaki faced the 2014 K-1 Koshien super lightweight champion Ren Hiramoto in the tournament finals, in the main event of Krush 66 on June 12, 2016. He won the fight by majority decision, with two scorecards of 29–28 and one scorecard of 29–29.

Krush lightweight title reign
Sasaki made his first title defense against Hiroto Iwasaki, in the co-main event of Krush.70 on October 15, 2016. He won the fight by unanimous decision, with scores of 30–28, 30–27 and 30–26. He scored the sole knockdown of the fight in the second round, dropping Iwasaki with a right hook.

Sasaki was booked to face Wei Rui in the quarterfinals of the 2017 K-1 World GP Lightweight Championship Tournament, held on February 25, 2017. He lost to the eventual tournament winner by a second-round knockout.

Sasaki made his second Krush lightweight title defense against Toshiki Taniyama at Krush 78 on August 6, 2017. He won the fight by unanimous decision.

Sasaki faced Ren Hiramoto at K-1 World GP 2017 Heavyweight Championship Tournament on November 23, 2017. The bout was a rematch of their Krush 66 fight, which Sasaki won by majority decision. He was less successful in their second meeting, as Hiramoto won the fight by unanimous decision.

Sasaki made his third Krush title defense against Gonnapar Weerasakreck at Krush.87 on April 22, 2017. Gonnapar won the fight by unanimous decision, with all three judges scoring the fight 30–26 in his favor. Sasaki was knocked down in the third round, as Gonnapar dropped him with a right hook.

Super Lightweight career

K-1 Super Lightweight Grand Prix
Sasaki faced Wang Zhiwei in a -64 kg catchweight bout in his next bout, at Krush.90 on July 22, 2018. He won the fight by unanimous decision, with two scorecards of 30–29 and one scorecard of 30–28. After successfully rebounding from his title loss, it was revealed that Sasaki would participate in the 2018 K-1 World GP Super Lightweight Championship Tournament on November 3, 2018. He was booked to face Sam Hill in the tournament quarterfinals.

Sasaki won the quarterfinal bout against Sam Hill by unanimous decision, with scores of 30–28, 30–28 and 30–27. He faced the former Krush super lightweight champion Jun Nakazawa in the penultimate bout of the tournament. Sasaki won the fight by unanimous decision as well. Sasaki faced the two-time K-1 super lightweight tournament winner Kaew Fairtex in the tournament finals. He lost the fight by unanimous decision, with two judges scoring the fight 30–29 for Kaew, while the third judge scored the bout 29–28 in his favor.

Pre-Krush title reign bouts
Sasaki was booked to fight the Rukiya Anpo at K-1 World GP 2019: K'FESTA 2 on March 10, 2019. Anpo won the fight by unanimous decision, with scores of 30–27, 30-27 and 29–28.

Sasaki faced the former RISE Lightweight and KNOCK OUT Super Lightweight champion Fukashi Mizutani at K-1 World GP 2019: Super Bantamweight World Tournament on June 30, 2019. He won the fight by a third-round technical knockout. He cut Fukashi with a spinning backfist in the second round, which prompted the referee to call in the ringside physician, who allowed the fight to go on. The doctor was called in the more times before the fight was finally waved off near the end of the third round. Although Fukashi complained that he was hit with the forearm instead of the back of the fist, both the referee and K-1 producer Takumi Nakamura deemed the strike to have been legal.

Krush Super Lightweight champion
Sasaki faced the Krush Super Lightweight champion Hayato Suzuki in a non-title bout at K-1 World GP 2019 Yokohamatsuri on November 24, 2019. He won the fight by unanimous decision, with scores of 30–28, 30–28 and 29–28. An immediate rematch was booked for Krush.111 on February 24, 2020, with Suzuki's Krush Super lightweight title on the line. He won the fight by unanimous decision, with all three judge scoring the bout 30–26 in his favor. Sasaki scored the sole knockdown of the fight in the second round, dropping Suzuki with  a right hook.

Sasaki made the first defense of his newly acquired title against the 2016 K-1 Koshien super lightweight champion Kensei Kondo. The bout was scheduled as the main event of Krush 114, which took place on July 11, 2020. He won the fight by a dominant unanimous decision, with all three judges awarding him a 30–26 scorecard.

Sasaki faced Kota Nakano in a non-title bout at Krush.118 on October 17, 2020. He won the fight by unanimous decision, with scores of 29–28, 29–28 and 30–28. Sasaki returned to K-1 for his next bout, as he was booked to face Tetsuya Yamato at K-1 World GP 2020 Winter's Crucial Bout on December 13, 2020. He won the fight by a unanimous decision, with two judges scoring the bout 30–29 in his favor, while the third one scored it 30–28 for him.

Sasaki made his second Krush title defense against Jin Hirayama at Krush 125 on May 30, 2021. He won the fight by unanimous decision, with scores of 30–29, 30–28 and 30–28.

Sasaki faced the former K-1 Lightweight titleholder Kenta Hayashi at K-1 World GP 2021: Yokohamatsuri on September 20, 2021. He won the fight by unanimous decision. Sasaki was next booked to face Vitor Tofanelli at K-1 World GP 2022 Japan on February 27, 2022. He won the fight by unanimous decision.

Sasaki made his third Krush title defense against Hikaru Terashima in the main event of Krush.138 on June 17, 2022. He won the fight by a third-round technical knockout, stopping Terashima with a flurry of punches, after having knocked him down once previously in the round.

Sasaki challenged the reigning K-1 Super Lightweight titleholder Tetsuya Yamato at K-1 World GP 2022 Yokohamatsuri on June 17, 2022. The title bout was a rematch two years in the making, as Sasaki had previously beaten Yamato by unanimous decision at K-1 World GP 2020 Winter's Crucial Bout on December 13, 2020. He lost the rematch by unanimous decision, with scores of 30–28, 30–28 and 29–28.

Sasaki vacated the Krush super lightweight title on December 16, 2022.

Post title reign
Sasaki faced the former RISE Lightweight champion Taiju Shiratori at RISE ELDORADO 2023 on March 26, 2023.

Titles and accomplishments

Professional
K-1
2018 K-1 World Super Lightweight Tournament runner-up
Krush
2016 Krush Lightweight (-63 kg) Championship
Two successful title defenses
2020 Krush Super Lightweight (-65 kg) Championship
Three successful title defenses
Most wins in Krush title bouts
Tied second most consecutive Krush title defenses

Fight record

|- style="background:#;"
| 2023-03-26 || ||align=left| Taiju Shiratori || RISE ELDORADO 2023 || Tokyo, Japan || ||  ||
|-  style="text-align:center; background:#fbb;"
| 2022-09-11 || Loss || align=left| Tetsuya Yamato ||  K-1 World GP 2022 Yokohamatsuri  || Yokohama, Japan || Decision (Unanimous) || 3 || 3:00 
|-
! style=background:white colspan=9 |

|-  style="text-align:center; background:#cfc;"
| 2022-06-17 || Win || align=left| Hikaru Terashima ||  Krush.138  || Tokyo, Japan || TKO (Ref.stoppage/punches) || 3 ||1:31   
|-
! style=background:white colspan=9 |

|- style="background:#cfc"
| 2022-02-27||Win||align=left| Vitor Tofanelli ||  K-1 World GP 2022 Japan || Tokyo, Japan ||Decision (Unanimous) || 3 || 3:00
|-
|-  style="text-align:center; background:#cfc;"
| 2021-09-20 || Win ||align=left| Kenta Hayashi || K-1 World GP 2021: Yokohamatsuri || Yokohama, Japan || Decision (Unanimous) || 3 || 3:00

|-  style="text-align:center; background:#cfc;"
| 2021-05-30 ||Win || align=left| Jin Hirayama ||  Krush.125  || Tokyo, Japan || Decision (Unanimous)|| 3 ||3:00   
|-
! style=background:white colspan=9 |

|-  style="text-align:center; background:#cfc;"
| 2020-12-13 || Win || align=left| Tetsuya Yamato||  K-1 World GP 2020 Winter's Crucial Bout  || Tokyo, Japan || Decision (Unanimous) || 3 || 3:00

|-  style="text-align:center; background:#cfc;"
| 2020-10-17 || Win || align=left| Kota Nakano||  Krush.118  || Tokyo, Japan || Decision (Unanimous) || 3||3:00

|-  style="text-align:center; background:#cfc;"
| 2020-07-11 || Win || align=left| Kensei Kondo||  Krush.114  || Tokyo, Japan || Decision (Unanimous) ||3  || 3:00  
|-
! style=background:white colspan=9 |

|-  style="text-align:center; background:#cfc;"
| 2020-02-24 || Win || align=left| Hayato Suzuki||  Krush.111  || Tokyo, Japan ||Decision (Unanimous) ||3  || 3:00  
|-
! style=background:white colspan=9 |

|-  style="text-align:center; background:#cfc;"
| 2019-11-24 || Win|| align=left| Hayato Suzuki||  K-1 World GP 2019 Yokohamatsuri  || Yokohama, Japan || Decision (Unanimous)|| 3 || 3:00

|-  style="text-align:center; background:#cfc;"
| 2019-06-30|| Win ||align=left| Fukashi || K-1 World GP 2019: Super Bantamweight World Tournament || Saitama, Japan || TKO (Doctor Stoppage) || 3 || 2:14

|-  style="text-align:center; background:#FFBBBB;"
| 2019-03-10|| Loss ||align=left| Rukiya Anpo || K-1 World GP 2019: K’FESTA 2 || Saitama, Japan || Decision (Unanimous) || 3 || 3:00

|- align="center"  bgcolor="#FFBBBB"
| 2018-11-03 || Loss || align=left| Kaew Fairtex || K-1 World GP 2018: Super Lightweight Championship Tournament, Final || Saitama, Japan || Decision (Unanimous) || 3 || 3:00
|-
! style=background:white colspan=9 |

|- align="center"  bgcolor="#CCFFCC"
| 2018-11-03 || Win || align=left| Jun Nakazawa || K-1 World GP 2018: Super Lightweight Championship Tournament, Semi Finals || Saitama, Japan || Decision (Unanimous) || 3 || 3:00

|- align="center"  bgcolor="#CCFFCC"
| 2018-11-03 || Win || align=left| Sam Hill || K-1 World GP 2018: Super Lightweight Championship Tournament, Quarter Finals || Saitama, Japan || Decision (Unanimous) || 3 || 3:00

|-  style="text-align:center; background:#CCFFCC;"
| 2018-07-22|| Win ||align=left| Wang Zhiwei || Krush.90 || Tokyo, Japan || Decision (Unanimous) || 3 || 3:00

|-  style="text-align:center; background:#FFBBBB;"
| 2018-04-22|| Loss ||align=left| Gonnapar Weerasakreck || Krush.87 || Tokyo, Japan || Decision (Unanimous) || 3 || 3:00
|-
! style=background:white colspan=9 |

|-  style="text-align:center; background:#FFBBBB;"
| 2017-11-23|| Loss || align=left| Ren Hiramoto || K-1 World GP 2017 Heavyweight Championship Tournament|| Japan || Decision (Unanimous) || 3 || 3:00

|-  style="text-align:center; background:#CCFFCC;"
| 2017-08-06|| Win || align=left| Toshiki Taniyama || Krush.78  || Tokyo, Japan || Decision (Unanimous)|| 3 || 3:00  
|-
! style=background:white colspan=9 |

|-  style="text-align:center; background:#CCFFCC;"
| 2017-06-03|| Win || align=left| Jin Ying || Wu Lin Feng 2017: China VS Japan || Changsha, China || Decision (Split) || 3 || 3:00

|-  style="text-align:center; background:#FFBBBB;"
| 2017-02-25|| Loss || align=left| Wei Rui || K-1 World GP 2017 Lightweight Championship Tournament, Quarter Finals || Tokyo, Japan || KO (Left Hook) || 2 || 1:04

|-  style="text-align:center; background:#CCFFCC;"
| 2016-10-15|| Win || align=left| Hiroto Iwasaki || Krush.70 || Tokyo, Japan || Decision (Unanimous)|| 3 || 3:00  
|-
! style=background:white colspan=9 |

|-  style="text-align:center; background:#CCFFCC;"
| 2016-06-12|| Win || align=left| Ren Hiramoto || Krush 66: -63 kg Tournament, Final || Japan || Decision (Majority) || 3 || 3:00
|- 
! style=background:white colspan=9 |

|-  style="text-align:center; background:#CCFFCC;"
| 2016-03-20|| Win || align=left| Takayuki Minamino || Krush 64: -63 kg Tournament, Semi Final || Japan || Decision (Unanimous)|| 3 || 3:00

|-  style="text-align:center; background:#CCFFCC;"
| 2016-01-17|| Win || align=left| Hisaki Higashimoto || Krush 62: -63 kg Tournament, Quarter Final || Japan || Decision (Majority)|| 3 || 3:00

|-  style="text-align:center; background:#CCFFCC;"
| 2015-10-04|| Win || align=left| Naoki Terasaki || Krush 59 || Japan || Decision (Unanimous)|| 3 || 3:00

|-  style="text-align:center; background:#FFBBBB;"
| 2015-04-12|| Loss || align=left| Hiroto Iwasaki || Krush 53 || Japan || Decision (Unanimous)|| 3 || 3:00

|-  style="text-align:center; background:#FFBBBB;"
| 2015-01-04|| Loss || align=left| Ryuki Iwashita || Krush 49 || Japan || Decision (Unanimous)|| 3 || 3:00

|-  style="text-align:center; background:#CCFFCC;"
| 2014-11-09|| Win || align=left| Taro Hayasaka || Krush 47 || Japan || KO (Punches) || 1 || 2:46

|-  style="text-align:center; background:#CCFFCC;"
| 2014-09-08|| Win || align=left| Zhang Jouweng || || China || KO || 1 ||

|-  style="text-align:center; background:#FFBBBB;"
| 2014-03-08|| Loss || align=left| Minoru Kimura || Krush 39|| Japan || TKO (3 Knockdowns/Left+Right Hook) || 1 || 2:49

|-  style="text-align:center; background:#CCFFCC;"
| 2013-11-10|| Win || align=left| Ikki || Krush 34 || Japan || Decision (Unanimous)|| 3 || 3:00

|-  style="text-align:center; background:#CCFFCC;"
| 2013-08-11|| Win || align=left| Joe Utsunomiya || Krush 30 || Japan || KO (Punches & Knee) || 1 || 2:51

|-  style="text-align:center; background:#CCFFCC;"
| 2013-06-02|| Win || align=left| Kengo Sonoda || Krush-IGNITION 2013 vol.4 || Japan || Decision (Unanimous)|| 3 || 3:00

|- align="center"  bgcolor="#FFBBBB"
| 2013-03-03|| Loss || align=left| Minoru Kimura || Krush-IGNITION 2013 vol.2|| Japan || KO (Left Hook) || 1 || 2:19

|-  style="text-align:center; background:#CCFFCC;"
| 2012-12-14|| Win || align=left| Yuki Izuka || Krush 25 || Japan || Decision (Unanimous)|| 3 || 3:00

|-  style="text-align:center; background:#FFBBBB;"
| 2012-09-09|| Loss || align=left| Hisaki Higashimoto || Krush YOUTH GP 2012, Final || Japan || Decision || 3 || 3:00

|-  style="text-align:center; background:#CCFFCC;"
| 2012-09-09|| Win || align=left| Yuya || Krush YOUTH GP 2012, Semi Final || Japan || Decision (Majority)|| 3 || 3:00

|-  style="text-align:center; background:#FFBBBB;"
| 2012-07-21|| Loss || align=left| Hiroya || Krush.20 || Japan || KO (Low Kick)|| 3 || 2:43

|-  style="text-align:center; background:#FFBBBB;"
| 2012-06-08|| Loss || align=left| Atsushi Ogata || Krush.19 || Japan || Decision (Majority)|| 3 || 3:00

|-  style="text-align:center; background:#FFBBBB;"
| 2011-12-09|| Loss || align=left| Kengo Sonoda || Krush.14 || Japan || Decision (Unanimous) || 3 || 3:00

|-  style="text-align:center; background:#FFBBBB;"
| 2011-10-10 || Loss ||align=left| Masaaki Noiri || Krush 2011 Under-22 ~63 kg Supernova~ Tournament, Semi Finals || Tokyo, Japan || KO (left hook to the body) || 2 || 1:42

|-  style="text-align:center; background:#CCFFCC;"
| 2011-10-10 || Win ||align=left| Shota || Krush 2011 Under-22 ~63 kg Supernova~ Tournament, Quarter Finals || Tokyo, Japan || KO || 3 || 1:24

|-  style="text-align:center; background:#CCFFCC;"
| 2011-07-16 || Win ||align=left| Hayato Uesugi || Krush -70 kg Inaugural Tournament || Tokyo, Japan || Decision (Majority)|| 3 || 3:00

|-  style="text-align:center; background:#FFBBBB;"
| 2010-10-31 || Loss ||align=left| "Dynamite" Takahashi Yuta || Krush-EX ～Road to the CHAMPIONSHIP～ || Tokyo, Japan || Decision (Unanimous)|| 3 || 3:00

|-  style="text-align:center; background:#c5d2ea;"
| 2010-08-14 || Draw ||align=left| Shunta || Krush.9  || Tokyo, Japan || Decision || 3 || 3:00

|-  style="text-align:center; background:#FFBBBB;"
| 2010-05-27 || Loss ||align=left| Tsuyoshi Nakashima || Krush.7 || Tokyo, Japan || Decision (Unanimous) || 3 || 3:00

|-  style="text-align:center; background:#FFBBBB;"
| 2010-02-19 || Loss ||align=left| Yuki Matsuno || Krush-EX 2010 vol.1  || Tokyo, Japan || Decision (Unanimous) || 3 || 3:00

|-  style="text-align:center; background:#CCFFCC;"
| 2009-12-04 || Win ||align=left| Shinichiro Ishii || Krush-EX || Tokyo, Japan || Decision (Unanimous) || 3 || 3:00

|-  style="text-align:center; background:#CCFFCC;"
| 2009-10-12 || Win ||align=left| Takuya Kurokawa || Krush-EX || Tokyo, Japan || Decision (Unanimous) || 3 || 3:00

|-  style="text-align:center; background:#CCFFCC;"
| 2009-05-17 || Win ||align=left| Yuki Hayano || Krush.3 || Tokyo, Japan || KO || 2 || 2:31

|-
| colspan=9 | Legend:    

Legend: 

|}

See also
 List of male kickboxers

References

Living people
1990 births
Japanese male kickboxers
People from Machida, Tokyo
Sportspeople from Tokyo